The unification of Saint Martin is the proposed unification of the small island of Saint Martin, located in the Caribbean Sea. Currently, it is divided into Sint Maarten (the southern portion of the island, one of the constituent countries within the Kingdom of the Netherlands) and the Collectivity of Saint Martin (the northern portion of the island, an integral part of France). The island has been divided since the signing of the Treaty of Concordia in 1648, which today remains as one of the oldest treaties still in effect.

The Treaty of Concordia allows freedom of movement between both parts of the island, which has promoted a common sentiment among the island's inhabitants, although this is also the reason why some see a formal unification as unnecessary. Other arguments against unification of the island are that neither France nor the Netherlands would allow it and that both sides would require full independence to achieve it.

On 31 August 1990, the "Unity Flag" of Saint Martin was adopted at the Preliminary Conference on National Symbols at the Philipsburg Jubilee Library, in Sint Maarten. This flag was created to represent the people of both halves of the island and the unification of the latter, and is hoisted today on some houses and sometimes by churches and religious groups in Saint Martin. In August 2020, when restrictions and controls were added to the Saint Martin–Sint Maarten border to contain the COVID-19 pandemic, some protesters against these measures flew this flag with them. In September 2020, these restrictions were lifted, and people from both sides of the island started chanting "One island, one people, one destiny".

Some notable supporters of this movement include Albert Fleming, former leader of the Collectivity of Saint Martin, who in 2014 stated his support for the unification of the island.

See also
 Samoan unification

References

Saint Martin (island)
Politics of the Collectivity of Saint Martin
Politics of Sint Maarten
Society of the Collectivity of Saint Martin
Society of Sint Maarten
National unifications
France–Netherlands relations
Proposed political unions
Public policy proposals